You Can't Win was a 1966 British television series made by ITV as an adaptation of the novels Scenes from Provincial Life and Scenes from Married Life by William Cooper. It stars Ian McShane as protagonist Joe Lunn,  an English provincial grammar school physics teacher in 1939 who later moves to London and into the English establishment.

Cast 
 Ian McShane as Joe Lunn 
 John Humphry as Robert Watson 
 Peter Birrel as Tom Jacobs
 Anton Darby as Steve
 Patricia Garwood as Myrtle 
 Andrew Rimmer as Trevor
 David Robinson as Frank
 Jennie Linden as Elspeth 
 Michael Barrington as Roland Bolshaw
 Ann Curthoys as Annette 
 Rosemary Frankau as Miss Froggatt 
 Roger Hammond as Harry
 Donald Hewlett as Daddy 
 Marie Hopps as Mrs Harrison
 Mike Lucas as Benny
 Geraldine Newman as Barbara 
 William Victor as Fred

Episode list
Who's for America?
In at the Deep End
Chaos is Come
Goodbye Myrtle Goodbye
The New Look
Learning the Law
The Stream of Life

External links 

1960s British drama television series
1966 British television series debuts
1966 British television series endings
British drama television series
ITV television dramas
Television shows produced by Granada Television